Scott James Remnant (born 18 July 1980) is an open source software engineer. Scott served as a long-time Debian developer until 2006 and worked as "Ubuntu Developer Manager" on the Ubuntu Linux distribution at Canonical Ltd. He now works at Google as a Technical Lead on Bluetooth Systems.

Work
 Ran the Linux humor website Segfault.org
 While a Debian developer, Scott maintained several important packages, notably libtool and dpkg
 Is the author of the Upstart initialization system
 Developed the Planet weblog aggregation system
 He served on the Ubuntu Technical Board until October 2011

Personal life
Scott is openly gay, and believes it important to be open about it to support others in the open source community.

References

External links
 Interview with Remnant by FOSDEM
 Another interview with Remnant focusing on Upstart
 

1980 births
Living people
Free software programmers
Debian people
Open source people
Ubuntu (operating system) people
Google employees

English LGBT people
Gay men